Larimer is an unincorporated community in Westmoreland County, Pennsylvania, United States. Larimer has a post office, with ZIP code 15647, which opened on August 16, 1852.

References

Unincorporated communities in Westmoreland County, Pennsylvania
Unincorporated communities in Pennsylvania